The 2009–10 season was the 107th in the history of the Southern League, which is an English football competition featuring semi-professional and amateur clubs from the South West, South Central and Midlands of England and South Wales.

At the end of the previous season Division One Midlands was renamed Division One Central.

Premier Division
The Premier Division consisted of 22 clubs, including 17 clubs from the previous season and five new clubs:
Two clubs promoted from Division One Midlands:
Leamington
Nuneaton Town

Two clubs promoted from Division One South & West:
Didcot Town
Truro City

Plus:
Hednesford Town, transferred from Northern Premier League

Farnborough won the Premier Division and were promoted to the Conference South, while play-off winners Nuneaton Town achieved the second promotion in two seasons after club reorganization to return in Conference.

Clevedon Town and Rugby Town were the only clubs relegated this season, while Merthyr Tydfil were expelled from the league after failing to meet a FA deadline to give assurances that they could trade effectively during 2010–11, liquidated and reborn under the name Merthyr Town three divisions below Southern League Premier Division. Tiverton Town and Hemel Hempstead Town were reprieved from relegation due to clubs higher up the pyramid folded and demoted.

League table

Play-offs

Results

Stadia and locations

Division One Central
The division was renamed at the end of the previous season and consisted of 22 clubs, including 17 clubs from previous season Midland division and five new clubs:
Three clubs transferred from Division One South & West:
Beaconsfield SYCOB
Burnham
Slough Town

Plus:
Biggleswade Town, promoted from the Spartan South Midlands League
Hitchin Town, relegated from the Premier Division 

Bury Town won the division in their second season in the Southern League and returned to the Isthmian League to take a place in Premier Division, while play-off winners Chesham United went back to Southern League Premier Division after three seasons of absence. Aylesbury United finished bottom of the table and were relegated to the lower leagues along with Rothwell United who resigned from the league at the end of the season. Thus, Barton Rovers finished second bottom were reprieved from relegation.

League table

Play-offs

Results

Stadia and locations

Division One South & West
Division One South & West consisted of 22 clubs, including 16 clubs from previous season and six new clubs:
Bedfont Green, promoted from the Combined Counties League
Frome Town, promoted from the Western League
Hungerford Town, promoted from the Hellenic League
Mangotsfield United, relegated from the Premier Division
VT, promoted from the Wessex League
Yate Town, relegated from the Premier Division

Windsor & Eton won the division and got a place in Premier Division along with play-off winners Cirencester Town, who returned there at the second push. A.F.C. Hayes finished second bottom but were reprieved from relegation due to higher league clubs problems. Thus, Bracknell Town, finished bottom of the table, were the only club relegated to the lower league this season.

League table

Play-offs

* after extra time

Results

Stadia and locations

See also
Southern Football League
2009–10 Isthmian League
2009–10 Northern Premier League

References 

Southern Football League seasons
7